Shock Records (now part of Shock Entertainment) is an Australian independent record label.

History
The three founding members had all previously worked in music retail or distribution: Williams for a Melbourne distribution company called "Musicland", Falvo for Exposure Records and McGee for Greville Records.

Other ventures
Shock also started the company CDFA, an entertainment distribution and fulfilment company, which also engages in music publishing. Recent developments include the launch of Ragged Company Touring and Kimchi Creative Services.

See also
 List of record labels
 :Category:Shock Records albums

References

External links
 

Record labels established in 1988
1988 establishments in Australia
Australian independent record labels
Heavy metal record labels
Record labels based in Melbourne
Alternative rock record labels
Hardcore record labels